Muhammad Aslam may refer to:

 Muhammad Aslam (field hockey) (born 1910), Indian field hockey player
 Muhammad Haroon Aslam, Pakistani Army general
 Muhammad Havlidar Aslam (born 1921), Pakistani Olympic runner
 Muhammad Aslam (judge) (1947–2020), PakistanI jurist and lawyer
 Khwaja Muhammad Aslam (1922–2019), Pakistani sprinter

See also
 Mohammad Aslam (disambiguation)